Two steamships of La Veloce Navigazione Italiana a Vapore were named Vittoria:

, in service 1902–10
, in service 1887–99

Ship names